Emeric, also Emericus, Emerick, Emery, Emory, and venerated as Saint Emeric (c. 1007 –  2 September 1031) was the son of King Stephen I of Hungary and Giselle of Bavaria.

Life

Family
Emeric is assumed to be the second son of Stephen I. Named after his maternal uncle Henry II, he was the only one of Stephen's sons who reached adulthood.

Education
Emeric was educated in a strict and ascetic spirit by the Benedictine monk from Venice, Gerard, from the age of 15 to 23. He was intended to be the next monarch of Hungary, and his father wrote his Admonitions to prepare him for this task. His father tried to make Emeric co-heir still in his lifetime. 

He married in the year 1022.  The identity of his wife is disputed.  Some say it was Irene Monomachina, a relative of Byzantine emperor Constantine IX Monomachos, or a female member of the Argyros family to which Byzantine emperor Romanos III Argyros belonged.  Other say it was Patricissa of Croatia, the daughter of Krešimir III of Croatia. Another possible person may have been Adelaide/Rixa of Poland or one of her unnamed sisters.

Death and sainthood
The succession plans of Emeric's father could never be fulfilled: on 2 September 1031, at age 24, Emeric was killed by a boar while hunting. It is assumed that this happened in Hegyközszentimre (presently Sântimreu, Romania). He was buried in the Székesfehérvár Basilica. Several wondrous healings and conversions happened at his grave, so on 5 November 1083 King Ladislaus I unearthed Emeric's bones in a large ceremony, and Emeric was canonised for his pious life and purity along with his father and Bishop Gerard of Csanád by Pope Gregory VII.

Emeric is most often pictured in knight's armour with crown and lily. It is believed by some Hungarians that Amerigo Vespucci, the Italian explorer and the namesake of the Americas, was named after the saint, but no proof of this etymology exists.

See also
Isten, hazánkért térdelünk

Further reading
Vita sanctorum Stephani regis et Emerici ducis: ad fidem codicum seculi xii, xiii, et xv;  ed. M. Florianus. Leipzig: Brockhaus, 1881.

References

1000s births
1031 deaths
House of Árpád
Beatified and canonised Árpádians
Medieval Hungarian saints
Hungarian Roman Catholic saints
11th-century Christian saints
Roman Catholic royal saints
Canonizations by Pope Gregory VII
Deaths due to boar attacks
Accidental deaths in Hungary
Hunting accident deaths
Heirs apparent who never acceded
Sons of kings